Lemyra is a genus of tiger moths in the family Erebidae. The genus contains many species from East and South Asia, Sundaland and Australia. It was described by Francis Walker in 1856.

Species

Subgenus Lemyra 

 Lemyra extensa Walker, 1856
 Lemyra maculifascia (Walker, 1855)
 Lemyra philippinica Thomas, 1990
 Lemyra punctatostrigata (Bethune-Baker, 1904)
 Lemyra quadrisaccus (Holloway, 1982)
 Lemyra venosa (Moore, 1879)

Subgenus Thyrgorina Walker, [1865] 

 Lemyra alikangensis (Strand, 1915)
 Lemyra alleni Thomas, 1990
 Lemyra anormala (Daniel, 1943)
 Lemyra barliga Thomas, 1990
 Lemyra bimaculata (Moore, 1879)
 Lemyra biseriata (Moore, 1877)
 Lemyra boghaika Tshistjakov & Kishida, 1994
 Lemyra bornemontana Holloway, 1988
 Lemyra burmanica (Rothschild, 1910)
 Lemyra copiosa Thomas, 1990
 Lemyra costalis (J.Singh & A.Singh, 1998)
 Lemyra costimacula (Leech, 1899)
 Lemyra crama Černý, 2009
 Lemyra cretata Černý, 2009
 Lemyra dejongi Thomas, 1990
 Lemyra diluta Thomas, 1990
 Lemyra everetti (Rothschild, 1910)
 Lemyra excelsa Thomas, 1990
 Lemyra eximia (Swinhoe, 1891)
 Lemyra fallaciosa (Matsumura, 1927)
 Lemyra flammeola (Moore, 1877)
 Lemyra flavalis (Moore, 1865)
 Lemyra flaveola (Leech, 1899)
 Lemyra gloria Fang, 1993
 Lemyra hanoica (Daniel, 1953)
 Lemyra heringi (Daniel, 1943)
 Lemyra hyalina (Fang, 1990)
 Lemyra imparilis (Butler, 1877)
 Lemyra inaequalis (Butler, 1879)
 Lemyra infernalis (Butler, 1877)
 Lemyra jankowskii (Oberthür, 1881)
 Lemyra jeremyi Thomas, 1990
 Lemyra jiangxiensis (Fang, 1990)
 Lemyra kannegieteri (Rothschild, 1910)
 Lemyra khasiana Thomas, 1990
 Lemyra kobesi Thomas, 1990
 Lemyra kuangtungensis (Daniel, 1954)
 Lemyra malickyi Černý, 2009
 Lemyra melanochroa (Hampson, 1918)
 Lemyra melanosoma (Hampson, 1894)
 Lemyra melli (Daniel, 1943)
 Lemyra minuta Černý, 2009
 Lemyra moltrechti (Miyake, 1909)
 Lemyra multivittata (Moore, 1865)
 Lemyra murzinorum Dubatolov, 2007
 Lemyra neglecta (Rothschild, 1910)
 Lemyra neurica (Hampson, 1911)
 Lemyra nigrescens (Rothschild, 1910)
 Lemyra nigricosta Thomas, 1990
 Lemyra nigrifrons (Walker, 1865)
 Lemyra nocturna Thomas, 1990
 Lemyra obliquivitta (Moore, 1879)
 Lemyra pectorale Černý, 2009
 Lemyra phasma (Leech, 1899)
 Lemyra pilosa (Rothschild, 1910)
 Lemyra pilosoides (Daniel, 1943)
 Lemyra praetexta Černý, 2011
 Lemyra proteus (de Joannis, 1928)
 Lemyra pseudoflammeoida (Fang, 1983)
 Lemyra punctilinea (Moore, 1879)
 Lemyra rhodophila (Walker, 1864)
 Lemyra rhodophiloides (Hampson, 1909)
 Lemyra rubidorsa (Moore, 1865)
 Lemyra rubrocollaris Reich, 1937
 Lemyra sikkimensis (Moore, 1879)
 Lemyra sincera Fang, 1993
 Lemyra singularis (Roepke, 1940)
 Lemyra sordidescens (Hampson, 1901)
 Lemyra spilosomata (Walker, [1865] 1864)
 Lemyra stigmata (Moore, 1865)
 Lemyra subfascia (Walker, 1855)
 Lemyra toxopei (Roepke, 1946)
 Lemyra wernerthomasi Inoue, 1992 [1993]
 Lemyra ypsilon (Rothschild, 1910)
 Lemyra zhangmuna (Fang, 1982)

References
 , 1990: Die Gattung Lemyra (Lepidoptera, Arctiidae). Nachrichten des Entomologischen Vereins, Apollo. Supplementum 9: 1-83, Frankfurt am Main.

 
Spilosomina
Moth genera